Veena Sood (born 21 November), is a Canadian actress. Sood is best known for dramatic and comedic roles in a career spanning more than 3 decades.

Early life and education
She was born on 21 November in Nairobi, Kenya. Her father was a doctor and her mother, a nurse. When she was 7 years old, they immigrated to Canada. At the age of 16, she graduated from high school and later at the age of 20, graduated from University with a Bachelor in Fine Arts degree.

Personal life
Her brother Manoj Sood is also an actor, while their cousin, Ashwin Sood (previously married to popular singer Sarah McLachlan), is a musician. Her nephew Kama Sood is a filmmaker based in Vancouver, BC.

She married J. Johnson on 30 August 2008.

Career
After receiving her Bachelor of Fine Arts in Drama theater degree, Veena helped co-found Calgary's 'Loose Moose Theatre Company' with Improv master Keith Johnstone, and later with the Vancouver TheatreSports League. In 1991, she won the Jessie Award for Outstanding Performance for her role in the Green Thumb Theatre play 2 B Wut U R. In 2006, she received the Leo Award for Best Guest Performance by a Female in a Dramatic Series which she won for the role 'Preety' in the Godiva's episode Flipping Switches.

She has appeared in numerous films & television series;  Imagine Entertainment's Wedding Season, Welcome to Marwen (Robert Zemeckis), Corner Office, The X-Files, BattleStar Galactica, Caprica, Stargate, Away, Peacemaker, Lucifer, A Million Little Things, and several television movies.  She's also gifted in her comedic work, as well as having an ear for accents.   In 2006, she acted in the film Nina's Heavenly Delights where she speaks with Scottish/East Indian accent. Meanwhile, she appeared in American television, particularly on all three of the longest running North American science fiction series: The X-Files in 1993, Stargate SG-1 in 1997 and Smallville in 2001. Her role in the film Touch of Pink, received critical acclaim at the Sundance Film Festival.

She is often described as a prolific dramatic actress who starred in popular films such as The Accused, Loyalties, The Women of Marwen. She also performed well in television serials: Ghost Wars, The Indian Detective, Corner Gas Animated as well as in the web series Yoga Town.

She has received several honors from the Alliance of Canadian Cinema, Television and Radio Artists including the Lorena Gale Woman Of Distinction Award in November 2017 and the Sam Payne Award for contributions to humanity and artistic integrity in 2014. In 2019 she was honored by the Fund for the Arts on the North Shore (FANS) with the Distinguished Artist Award for international recognition in drama.

Filmography

Feature films

Television movies

Television

Short films

Video games

Mini TV serials

References

External links
 
 FANS pays Tribute to the Arts with awards ceremony

Living people
People from Nairobi
Kenyan people of Indian descent
Kenyan emigrants to Canada
Canadian film actresses
Canadian television actresses
Canadian people of Punjabi descent
Canadian actresses of Indian descent
Canadian Hindus
Year of birth missing (living people)
21st-century Canadian actresses